Baldissero may refer to

 Baldissero Canavese, comune in the Metropolitan City of Turin in the Italian region Piedmont
 Baldissero d'Alba,  comune in the Province of Cuneo in the Italian region Piedmont
 Baldissero Torinese, comune in the Metropolitan City of Turin in the Italian region Piedmont

See also 

 Baldisseri